Bansari is a 1978 Indian Bengali-language film directed by Ashim Banerjee starring Mithun Chakraborty and Sumitra Mukherjee.

Plot

Bansari is a family-oriented movie where emotions is more important than selfish thoughts.

Cast
Sumitra Mukherjee		
Mithun Chakraborty
Ajoy Banerjee		
Bireshwar Banerjee		
Robin Banerjee		
Satya Banerjee		
Biren Chatterjee		
Subal Chatterjee		
Bhupesh Das		
Bharati Devi		
Amar Dutta		
Shambhu Dutta		
Uma Dutta		
Satyen Ganguly		
Samar Kumar		
Harihar Mallick		
Barnali Mitra		
Master Moloy		
Anil Mukherjee		
Haridhan Mukherjee		
Milon Mukhopadhyay		 (as Milan Mukherjee)
Padmadevi		
Bishwanath Pal		
Bimal Patra		
Atreyi Roy		
Chandan Roy		
Pabir Roy		
Sova Sen		
Subrata Sensharma		
Anil Tribedi

References

External links
 

1978 films
Bengali-language Indian films
1970s Bengali-language films